Vladimir Vyacheslavovich Dzhubanov (born 3 December 1975) is a Russian professional football coach and a former player.

Club career
He made his debut in the Russian Premier League in 1996 for FC Spartak Moscow.

Honours
 Russian Premier League champion: 1996.
 Russian Cup finalist: 1996.
 Russian Second Division Zone West top scorer: 2003 (25 goals).

European club competitions
 UEFA Cup 1996–97 with FC Spartak Moscow: 4 games.
 UEFA Intertoto Cup 1997 with FC Lokomotiv Nizhny Novgorod: 5 games.

References

1975 births
Living people
Russian footballers
Russian expatriate footballers
Expatriate footballers in Latvia
FC Spartak Moscow players
Russian Premier League players
FC Lokomotiv Nizhny Novgorod players
Dinaburg FC players
FC Anzhi Makhachkala players
FC KAMAZ Naberezhnye Chelny players
Russian expatriate sportspeople in Latvia
People from Domodedovo (town)
Association football forwards
FC Spartak-2 Moscow players
Sportspeople from Moscow Oblast
20th-century Russian people
21st-century Russian people